The 8th Secretariat of the People's Movement for the Liberation of Angola (MPLA), officially the 8th Secretariat of the Political Bureau of the MPLA Central Committee, was elected at the 1st Ordinary Meeting of the 8th Politburo on 14 December 2021.

Members

References

External links
 MPLA Website

8th Secretariat of the People's Movement for the Liberation of Angola